The Central District of Astaneh-ye Ashrafiyeh County is a district (bakhsh) in Astaneh-ye Ashrafiyeh County, Gilan Province, Iran. At the 2006 census, its population was 72,867, in 21,592 families.  The District has one city: Astaneh-ye Ashrafiyeh. The District has four rural districts (dehestan): Chahardeh Rural District, Dehshal Rural District, Kisom Rural District, and Kurka Rural District.

References 

Astaneh-ye Ashrafiyeh County
Districts of Gilan Province